Operation Groper was an operation by Australian special forces immediately after World War II to discover the fate of missing Australian soldiers on Timor.

References

Groper
1945 in Portuguese Timor
Groper
South West Pacific theatre of World War II